Hampton High School is located in Hampton Township a northern suburb of Pittsburgh, Pennsylvania, USA. It is managed by the Hampton Township School District. Hampton High School was ranked #1 for the Best High Schools in the Pittsburgh, PA Area and ranked #7 for the Best Pennsylvania High Schools by U.S. News & World Report in 2020. This was a Blue Ribbon School for 1994–96. In a 2007 U.S. News & World Report article titled "America's Best High Schools", Hampton received a gold ranking, making it among the top 1% of US High Schools.

School statistics 

Statewide high school ranking (from national website, based solely on PSSA test scores)

2016- 63rd of 674
2015- 9th of 674
2014- 8th of 674
2013- 6th of 674
2012- 12th of 674
2011- 9th of 674
2010- 21st of 674

Sports
Hampton competes in District 7 (WPIAL) and in the PIAA

Hampton offers 24 interscholastic programs: Football, Rollerball, Boys' Soccer, Girls' Soccer, Boys' Cross Country, Girls' Cross Country, Golf, Boys' Tennis, Girls' Tennis, Volleyball, Boys' Basketball, Girls' Basketball, Boys' Swimming and Diving, Girls' Swimming and Diving, Girls' Competitive Spirit (Cheerleading), Girls' Gymnastics, Wrestling, Baseball, Softball, Boys' Track and Field and Girls' Track and Field, Boys' Lacrosse and Girls' Lacrosse. In addition there are Five Club Sports: Crew, Ice Hockey, In-line Hockey, Ultimate Frisbee and Disc Golf.

Hampton Team WPIAL or club Championships:2021: Boys Football (AAAA) 2015: Boys Lacrosse (Division 2) 2012: Boys Lacrosse (Division 2) 2011: Boys Soccer (AA)2011: Boys Lacrosse (Division 2) 2010: Boys Soccer (AA)2009: Boys Lacrosse (Division 2)2009: Boys Basketball (AAA)2009: Girls Ultimate Frisbee (section 1)+2009: Disc Golf+2008: Girls basketball (AAA)2006: Boys Lacrosse (Division 2)+2003: Boys Lacrosse (Division 2)+ 1999: Boys Swimming (AA)1998: Boys Swimming (AA)1997: Boys Swimming (AA)1995: Girls Soccer (AAA)1994: Girls Soccer (AAA)1994: Girls Tennis (AA)1993: Girls Swimming (AAA)1990: Boys Soccer (AA)

A club sport at the time.

PIAA state Championships:

2010: Boys Soccer (AA)1999: Boys Swimming (AA)1998: Boys Swimming (AA)1997: Boys Swimming (AA)1996: Boys Swimming (AA)1990: Boys Soccer (AA)

Notable alumni

 Former NFL football player Red Mack (Super Bowl I Champion)
 Comedian Steve Byrne.
 Tom Fec of the indie rock band Black Moth Super Rainbow.
 Musician and songwriter Kevin Garrett (musician) (co-writer and producer on Beyonce's Lemonade)

In popular culture
Hampton High School was used on location for the 2011 thriller Abduction.

Sources 
Hampton Township School District Website
https://web.archive.org/web/20090830173707/http://www.htsd.k12.pa.us/page.cfm?p=2477
Greatschools.net
wpial website
laxpower
PHUL website

References

Educational institutions established in 1943
Schools in Allegheny County, Pennsylvania
Education in Pittsburgh area
Public high schools in Pennsylvania
1943 establishments in Pennsylvania